Jiri Pokorny may refer to:
Jiří Pokorný (cyclist) (born 1956), Olympic cyclist
Jiří Pokorný (figure skater) (born 1953), Olympic figure skater